Belvin Perry Jr. (born October 10, 1949, in Orlando, Florida) is a personal-injury attorney and former chief judge of Florida's Ninth Judicial Circuit. He was the presiding judge for the high-profile Casey Anthony murder trial.

Early life and career
Perry's father, the late Belvin Perry, Sr. (born October 8, 1920–died May 16, 1995) served as one of Orlando's first two African-American police officers.

Perry earned his Bachelor of Science degree in History in 1972 from Tuskegee University. In 1974 he earned his Masters of Education from the same university. In 1977, Perry received a Juris Doctor degree from Texas Southern University's Thurgood Marshall School of Law.  Perry is a member of the Alpha Phi Alpha fraternity.

Judge Perry has been involved in two of Central Florida's most highly publicized trials. As a prosecutor, Perry was the lead attorney in the case of Florida v. Buenoaño, in which Judy Buenoano was tried and convicted of killing her son Michael Goodyear and her husband at the time, James Goodyear.  As a Circuit Court Judge, Perry presided over the case "State of Florida v. Casey Marie Anthony" (Case Number 2008 CF15606-0, in which Casey Anthony was charged in the death of her daughter Caylee Anthony. The jury found Anthony not guilty of First Degree Murder, Aggravated Child Abuse, and Aggravated Manslaughter of a child, but guilty of four misdemeanor counts of Providing False Information to a Law Enforcement Officer.

In 2014, Perry retired from the bench and immediately joined the Orlando law firm of Morgan & Morgan as a personal-injury attorney.

See also
 Casey Anthony trial
 Timeline of Casey Anthony case
Jose Baez (lawyer)
Linda Drane Burdick
Cheney Mason

References 

1949 births
African-American judges
Florida state court judges
Living people
People from Orlando, Florida
Jones High School (Orlando, Florida) alumni
Thurgood Marshall School of Law alumni
21st-century African-American people
20th-century African-American people